Nolan Jay Henke (born November 25, 1964) is an American professional golfer who has played on the PGA Tour and the Nationwide Tour.

Henke was born in Battle Creek, Michigan. He attended Florida State University in Tallahassee, Florida and was a distinguished member of the golf team. During his years at Florida State, Henke won seven tournaments and was an All-American for 3 consecutive years: 1985 – 1987. He turned pro in 1987 and joined the PGA Tour in 1988.

In the early 1990s, Henke won three PGA Tour events. His first win came at the 1990 B.C. Open. In 1991, he won the Phoenix Open, finished 5th on the money list, and had six top-10 finishes. His third win came in 1993 at the BellSouth Classic. His best finish in a major has been T6 at both the 1992 Masters Tournament and the 1993 PGA Championship.

As he has grown older, Henke has had difficulty maintaining his PGA Tour privileges, and has had to play some events on the Nationwide Tour. His best finish in this venue is a T-4 at the 2002 Preferred Health Systems Wichita Open.

Henke began playing on the Champions Tour in 2015.

Henke lives in Fort Myers, Florida. Each year, he hosts a charity event in Fort Myers to benefit Southwest Florida Children's Hospital and Hope Hospice House. He also had teamed with Patty Berg to promote the development of young players by sponsoring the Nolan Henke/Patty Berg Junior Masters tournament.

Amateur wins (11)
1985 Seminole Classic, Panhandle Intercollegiate, Forest Hills Invitational
1986 Porter Cup, Florida Intercollegiate
1987 American Amateur, Monroe Invitational, Seminole Golf Classic, South Florida Invitational, Jerry Pate Invitational, Metro Conference Championship

Professional wins (4)

PGA Tour wins (3)

PGA Tour playoff record (0–1)

Other wins (1)
1988 South Florida Open

Results in major championships

CUT = missed the half-way cut
"T" = tied

Summary

Most consecutive cuts made – 6 (1989 U.S. Open – 1992 Masters)
Longest streak of top-10s – 2 (1993 U.S. Open – 1993 PGA)

See also
1988 PGA Tour Qualifying School graduates
1989 PGA Tour Qualifying School graduates
List of Florida State Seminoles men's golfers

References

External links

American male golfers
Florida State Seminoles men's golfers
PGA Tour golfers
PGA Tour Champions golfers
Golfers from Michigan
Golfers from Florida
Sportspeople from Battle Creek, Michigan
Sportspeople from Fort Myers, Florida
1964 births
Living people